Michael Stich was the defending champion but lost in the first round to Marc-Kevin Goellner.

Marc Rosset won in the final 6–2, 7–5, 6–4 against Tim Henman.

Seeds
A champion seed is indicated in bold text while text in italics indicates the round in which that seed was eliminated.

 n/a
  Marcelo Ríos (second round)
  Thomas Enqvist (first round)
 n/a
  Félix Mantilla (second round)
  Tim Henman (final)
  Michael Stich (first round)
  Jan Siemerink (first round)

Draw

 NB: The Final was the best of 5 sets while all other rounds were the best of 3 sets.

Final

Section 1

Section 2

References
 1997 European Community Championships Draw

ECC Antwerp
1997 ATP Tour